Günter Benkö (born 12 July 1955 in Oberwart, Burgenland) is a retired football (soccer) referee from Austria, best known for supervising two matches during the 1998 FIFA World Cup in France. He also led two matches at the 2000 UEFA European Football Championship held in Belgium and the Netherlands. Benkö was in charge of the final of the UEFA Cup Winners' Cup 1998-99, on May 19, 1999 in Villa Park, Birmingham, between S.S. Lazio and RCD Mallorca.

External links
 Günter Benkö at WorldFootball.net

1955 births
Living people
People from Oberwart
Austrian football referees
UEFA Champions League referees
FIFA World Cup referees
1998 FIFA World Cup referees
UEFA Euro 2000 referees
Footballers from Burgenland
Austrian people of Hungarian descent